John Graham Anthony Turner (born 23 December 1954 in Gateshead) is a former professional footballer, who played in the Football League as a goalkeeper for Doncaster Rovers, Huddersfield Town, Reading, Torquay United, Chesterfield, and Peterborough United. He began his career with Derby County, but never appeared for the first team, and spent time with Brighton & Hove Albion and Burnley, again without appearing for the first team, and with non-league club Weymouth. His professional career ended when he broke his leg with 10 minutes left in an FA Cup tie against Leeds United; Peterborough hung on for a 1–0 upset win.

Honours
Individual
Toulon Tournament Best Goalkeeper: 1974

References

1954 births
Living people
English footballers
Footballers from Gateshead
Association football goalkeepers
Derby County F.C. players
Doncaster Rovers F.C. players
Brighton & Hove Albion F.C. players
Huddersfield Town A.F.C. players
Reading F.C. players
Torquay United F.C. players
Chesterfield F.C. players
Weymouth F.C. players
Burnley F.C. players
Peterborough United F.C. players
English Football League players